Çay Üzü (also, Chayuzi) is a village and municipality in the Yardymli Rayon of Azerbaijan.  It has a population of 956.  The municipality consists of the villages of Çay Üzü and Avur.

References 

Populated places in Yardimli District